Victor Egon Hanzeli, Sr. (1925 – April 23, 1991) was a Hungarian linguist and professor of Romance Languages and Literature at the University of Washington. His pioneering 1969 book, Missionary Linguistics in New France, is considered the best in its field. He spoke five languages.

Early life and education
Victor Hanzeli was born in Hungary in 1925. He started his academic studies at the University of Vienna and went on to graduate from the University of Budapest.

In 1947, Hanzeli moved to France, and in 1951 he moved to the United States. He continued his studies at Indiana University where received his doctorate in French literature and linguistics. His 1961 dissertation is titled  Early descriptions by French missionaries of Algonquian and Iroquoian languages: A study of seventeenth- and eighteenth-century practice in linguistics.

Career
Hanzeli joined the University of Washington faculty in 1957. He was active in University affairs and over the course of his career, served in several different roles in addition to teaching.

For five years he served as Chair of the Department of Romance Languages and Literature. He also served as Director of the Washington Foreign Language Program and coauthored a report to the Ford Foundation on it. In addition to these academic roles, he was also President of the University's chapter of the American Association of University Professors and served as faculty representative to the Washington State Legislature.

Hanzeli was one of only a few academics (the most notable exception being James Axtell) to study role of linguistics in the activities of Catholic and Protestant missionaries among Native American populations. His 1969 book, Missionary Linguistics in New France, is considered a pioneering study of missionary linguists in New France. It is still considered the best in the field.

Personal life
Hanzeli married his wife, Eva, sometime before moving to France in 1947. They had five children: Victor Jr., of Marysville; Beatrice, of Seattle; Tina Hodgins, of Olympia; Dennis, of Brier; and Gabriel, of Kent.

Hanzeli died on April 23, 1991 after a long illness.

Works

Dissertation

Articles and contributions

Books

Translations

References

1925 births
1991 deaths
20th-century American male writers
20th-century American non-fiction writers
20th-century American translators
20th-century linguists
American male non-fiction writers
American social sciences writers
Educators from Seattle
Eötvös Loránd University alumni
Historical linguists
Hungarian emigrants to the United States
Hungarian expatriates in Austria
Hungarian expatriates in France
Hungarian male writers
Indiana University alumni
Linguists from Hungary
Linguists from the United States
Translators from Hungarian
Translators to English
University of Washington faculty